Grigori Mikhailovich Nikitin (born 1889; died 1917) was an association football player. He was killed in action during World War I.

Nikitin played his only game for Russia on 1 July 1912 in a 1912 Olympics match against Germany.

See also
 List of Olympians killed in World War I

References

External links
  Profile

1889 births
1917 deaths
Russian footballers
Russia international footballers
Footballers at the 1912 Summer Olympics
Olympic footballers of Russia
Russian military personnel killed in World War I
Association football forwards